Euseius fustis is a species of mite in the family Phytoseiidae.

References

fustis
Articles created by Qbugbot
Animals described in 1962